Mayberry is an unincorporated community in Carroll County, Maryland, United States. It is served by the Westminster post office, and has the ZIP Code of 21158.

References

Unincorporated communities in Carroll County, Maryland
Unincorporated communities in Maryland